Gothatar is a village and former Village Development Committee that is now part of Kageshwari-Manohara Municipality in Kathmandu District in Province No. 3 of central Nepal. It being handled By ward Secretary name Pragyan Adhikari. At the time of the 2011 Nepal census it had a population of 26,169 and had 6,749 households in it. The newly built Bagmati bridge connects Gothatar with the roadway to Jorpati. The Krishna Parnami Mandir is one of the major attractions in Gothatar. In between 2007 and 2010, the density of population has rapidly increased as more and more houses are being constructed. The majority of the population in Gothatar consists of Hindu Brahmins and Kshetris. The natives are mainly farmers who still have cowsheds in their homes despite being very close to the rush of the metropolitan Kathmandu.

The public transportation in this area mainly consists of Nepal Yatayat, which formerly used to run from Ratnapark to Tej Binayak Chowk, but now has extended till Bodey. On a clear day, a beautiful panorama of the Ganesh Himal can be seen from here. Located on the banks of the Holy Bagmati River the soil of this region is found fertile.

References

Populated places in Kathmandu District